Nuclear art was an artistic approach developed  by some artists and painters, after the bombings of Hiroshima and Nagasaki.

Conception and origins
In the days, weeks and years following the atomic bombing of Japan, trained and untrained artists who survived the bombings began documenting their experiences in artworks. The U.S. occupation authorities controlled the release of photographs and film footage of these events, while photographers and artists on the ground continued to produce visual representations of the effects of nuclear warfare. Photographer Yōsuke Yamahata began taking photographs of Nagasaki on August 10, 1945 (the day after the bombing), however his photographs were not released to the public until 1952 when the magazine Asahi Gurafu published them.

Historical nuclear art in Italy
In 1948, the artistic movement of Eaismo published a manifesto illustrating some aspects of the atomic age and, at the same time, criticizing the industrial use of nuclear power.

It was a movement of poetry and painting, founded by the Italian artist Voltolino Fontani, aiming to balance the role of men in a society upset by  the danger  of nuclear radiation. The artistic group was strengthened by the poet Marcello Landi and by the literary critic Guido Favati. In 1948 Voltolino Fontani depicted the disintegration and fragmentation of an atom on canvas, by creating the artwork: Dinamica di assestamento e mancata stasi.

Plenty of Italian artists, in Milan and Naples, and foreigners like Yves Klein, Asger Jorn, Arman, Antonio Saura joined the movement. The main representative of the arte nucleare movement was Piero Manzoni, who in this context, for the first time in his life, put  his talent in evidence.

Unlike Eaismo, recommending artists to pursue painting values (and poetry), the arte nucleare movement tried to promote a new form of art in which painting was marginalized.

Historical nuclear art in Spain 
In the meantime, Spanish painter Salvador Dalí published the Mystical manifesto (1951), putting Catholic mysticism and nuclear themes together.
In this period Dalì created artworks like Idillio atomico (1945) and Leda Atomica (1949).

Historical nuclear art in France

In 1949  the French artist Bernard Lorjou started to paint his monumental artwork “l’age atomique”  (The atomic age). The painting was concluded after one year and is now located in the Centre Pompidou.

Historical nuclear art in the United States

The painter and photographer Eugene Von Bruenchenhein painted the artwork “Atomic age” in 1955, and other apocalyptical and post apocalyptical paintings up to 1965.

The British sculptor Henry Moore created a bronze public sculpture entitled Nuclear Energy (sculpture) (1967), which both depicted the fatality of nuclear weapons and celebrated the invention of nuclear energy for use as electrical power. The sculpture is located on the grounds of the University of Chicago, where the first self-sustaining nuclear reaction was produced at the Chicago Pile-1, under the oversight of the Manhattan Project and Enrico Fermi. The sculpture is in the form of a hybrid mushroom cloud and human skull.

Contemporary approaches to nuclear art

Japan

After the March 2011 accident that caused three nuclear reactors to melt down at the Fukushima Daiichi power plant in Japan, there have been numerous responses by contemporary Japanese artists, including Shigenobu Yoshida, Tatsuo Miyajima, Shimpei Takeda, Fuyuki Yamakawa, Iri and Toshi Maruki, and Hiroshima bomb survivor, Tadasi Tonoshiki. In 2015 an exhibition was organized in the Fukushima exclusion zone, "Don't Follow the Wind" by curator, Kenji Kubota, that includes the work of 12 international artists.

North America
The cultural critic, Akira Mizuta Lippit, has written that the bombings of Hiroshima and Nagasaki were the most significant photographic and cinematic event of the 20th Century. There have been numerous exhibitions of photographic works, including the 2015 show, Camera Atomica, at the Art Gallery of Ontario, exhibiting two hundred works.

References

Bibliography
 E.Baj, S.Dangelo, Manifeste de peinture nucleaire, Brussels, 1952, in T. Sauvage, Pittura italiana del dopoguerra, Scwwarz Editore, Milan, 1998.
Martina Corgnati, Il Movimento nucleare arte a Milano, edizioni Credito Artigiano, Milan, 1998.
 

Art movements
Nuclear warfare